The 1947–48 Chicago Black Hawks season was the team's 22nd season in the National Hockey League, and they were coming off a last place finish in the 1946–47 season, failing to qualify for post-season play.

The Black Hawks would make a big trade six games into the season, dealing the leading scorer from the 1946–47 season, Max Bentley, and Cy Thomas to the Toronto Maple Leafs in exchange for Gaye Stewart and Bud Poile.  Midway through the season, after a 7–19–2 start, Chicago would fire Johnny Gottselig and replace him with former Maple Leafs star Charlie Conacher, who would lead the team to a respectable 13–15–4 record.  The Hawks would finish in the basement of the NHL standings, with a record of 20–34–6, earning 46 points, and nine points behind the New York Rangers for the final playoff spot.  The Hawks would score an NHL high 195 goals, but would allow an NHL worst 225.

Offensively, the Hawks were led by Doug Bentley, who earned team highs in assists (37) and points (57).  Gaye Stewart would score a club high 26 goals and earn 55 points in 54 games with the Hawks, while Bud Poile would record 52 points.  Ernie Dickens would lead the defense with 20 points, while Ralph Nattrass had a club high 79 penalty minutes.

In goal, Emile Francis would get the majority of the action, playing in 54 games, and winning 18 of them, posting a 3.39 GAA along the way and earning a shutout.

Season standings

Record vs. opponents

Game log

Regular season

Season stats

Scoring leaders

Goaltending

References
SHRP Sports
The Internet Hockey Database
National Hockey League Guide & Record Book 2007

Notes

Chicago Blackhawks seasons
Chicago
Chicago